The New York Mets Hall of Fame was created in order to recognize the careers of former New York Mets players, managers, broadcasters and executives. There are presently 30 members. Originally located in the Diamond Club at Shea Stadium, the inductees are now honored with plaques in the Mets Hall of Fame and Museum at Citi Field, which opened in April 2010.  (In Citi Field's first season, 2009, the space was part of the Mets Team Store.)

Inductees

2023 Update (Additional stats, formatting needed):
Gary Cohen, Broadcaster
Harry Rose, Broadcaster
Howard Johnson, Third Baseman
Al Leiter, Left handed starting pitcher

See also

 New York Mets retired numbers
 New York Mets award winners and league leaders

References

External links
 Mets Hall of Fame. New York Mets official website
 Mets Hall of Fame and Museum. New York Mets official website
 Mets Hall of Fame Plaques. Photo gallery

Hall of Fame
Major League Baseball museums and halls of fame
Halls of fame in New York City
Sports museums in New York City
Baseball in New York City
Museums in Queens, New York
Awards established in 1981
1981 establishments in New York City
Flushing Meadows–Corona Park